The 127th Massachusetts General Court, consisting of the Massachusetts Senate and the Massachusetts House of Representatives, met in 1906 during the governorship of Curtis Guild Jr. William F. Dana served as president of the Senate and John N. Cole served as speaker of the House.

Senators

Representatives

See also
 59th United States Congress
 List of Massachusetts General Courts

References

Further reading

External links
 
 

Political history of Massachusetts
Massachusetts legislative sessions
massachusetts
1906 in Massachusetts